Aditya Birla Public School, Renukoot (ABPS) is a school in Renukoot, Uttar Pradesh state of India. It is a branch of the Aditya Birla Group Schools. The school has two playgrounds, one for the senior students and another for junior students. Both the playgrounds jointly have an area of 5 acres.

Management 

The school works under the flagship of Aditya Birla Group with the patronage of Hindalco Industries. There is a SMC (School Managing Committee) headed by the current President of the Industry.

The school has a teaching faculty of 36 staff, as well as a well furnished, designed, hygienic and clean campus, with  playing facilities. The current principal of this school is Mrs. Daphne Unger The current vice- principal is Mrs. Manisha Vaishnav.

Functions

The school organises Annual function, Annual Sports competitions, literary activities, cultural activities, art and craft competitions, quiz, paper reading, declamation, music competitions. 
Mrs. Uma Menon, Mr. Raj Kesher Singh, Mrs. Rani Patel, Mrs. Mala Bhargava, Mr. Shrikant Yadav, Mr. Prabhakar Khanduri and Mrs. Bharti Pandey are some of the cultural coordinators in the school premises.

School Fest 2020

In 2020 under the guidance of the Principal Mrs. Daphne Unger, the school organize its first school fest. This fest was similar to those fests which are organized at colleges. This fest allow multiple participation of almost each children from every class. Almost each student had won something in this fest which led to the end of topper worshiping. Various competitions were held in this fest like Singing competition, Dance competition, cooking competitions, debate, art competitions etc. And the Judges for the competitions were not only the school teachers but it also consisted of guardian of the students and various other Hindalco employees who were good in the related field.

School Staff
There is a total strength of 36 teaching staff. The Head teaching staff are:-

 Mr. Shrikant Yadav    (Head of Department of Social Studies)
 Mr. Vishal Raina      (Head of Department of Chemistry)
 Mr. R.N. Yadav        (Head of Department of Mathematics)
 Dr. S.K. Srivastava   (Head of Department of Physics)
 Dr. Manish Pandit     (Head of Department of Biology)
 Mr. Sumant Barman     (Head of Department of Accounts and B.St.) 
 Mr. Pulkit Gupta      (Head of Department of Economics)
 Mrs. Geeti Ujjaval Kesh  (Head of Department of English)
 Mr. Raj Kesher Singh  (Head of Department of Hindi)
 Mr. K.N. Tiwari       (Head of Department of Sanskrit)
 Mr. Rajendra Yadav    (Head of Department of Painting and Art)
 Dr. S.N. Mishra       (Head of Department of Music)
 Mr. Vivek Anand       (Head of Department of Computer Science)
 Mr. P. Khanduri       (Head of Department of Sports)
 

Schools in Uttar Pradesh
Buildings and structures in Sonbhadra district
Renukoot
Education in Sonbhadra district
Educational institutions established in 1971
1971 establishments in India